Lucas Entertainment is a New York-based gay pornographic studio started by porn star Michael Lucas. It is one of the largest such studios in the world. The studio is known for lavish, big-budget films, and it contends that its 2006 film Michael Lucas' La Dolce Vita is the most expensive gay porn ever made. The film won 14 GayVN awards in 2007, the current record.

To expand its direction, the studio hired mr. Pam Doré, gay adult film's only female videographer, as creative director of film and production in August 2008. Doré, who began her career at Falcon Video in 1996, was nominated for best director and cinematography at the GayVN Awards for the studio's 2008 Return to Fire Island.

In May 2009, Lucas Entertainment announced that it was filming on location the first gay porn film with only Israeli models, billing it as an effort to promote Israeli culture. The company subsequently launched its Men of Israel microsite introducing the actors and film concept. Lucas has called the film his most important, and journalists from The Atlantic, Out Magazine and Yediot Aharonot noted it as a landmark film as the first pornographic film shot on location with an all-Israeli cast; while Tablet Magazine and the Los Angeles Times remarked on it being the first to feature an all-Jewish cast.

In July, the studio announced on Lucas's blog that it will open a European headquarters in Paris, the site of its current production, Paris Playboys. In 2013 Lucas Entertainment went from being exclusively a condom-only studio to filming and releasing "bareback" sex content.

History

Michael Lucas founded his own production company, Lucas Entertainment, in 1998. He based the company in New York City (rather than Los Angeles, where many of the other pornography studios are located), in part, to take advantage of the lack of competition.

In 2004, Lucas Distribution, Inc., his adult video distribution company, began operations. Lucas directs, produces and stars in his own films under the Lucas Entertainment banner.
In March 2009 the studio hired Mr. Pam Doré as creative director of film and production. Doré was the videographer and editor for NakedSword's Tim & Roma Show. Doré, a 12-year veteran of the business, had shot and edited award-winning films for COLT Studio Group and Black Scorpion Entertainment, amongst others. She was nominated at the 2009 GayVN Awards for best director and cinematography for the studio's 2008 Return to Fire Island. In an interview, mr. Pam stated that she fulfills many roles on set, including "kick-ass cameraman, slutty friend or 'Mommy' if the boys need a hug or someone to talk with."

The studio announced on Lucas's blog in July 2009 that it was opening a European headquarters in Paris. The new office will centralize production services, including casting, filming, and promotions. The studio last filmed in France in October 2001 for Inside Paris, and announced it was to begin filming Paris Playboys in the city's gay district, Le Marais.

Productions

The studio is known for lavish, big-budget productions that approach gay pornography combining technical filmmaking expertise and raunch. The studio released its Gigolo in 2007. The film explored the underworld of New York City escorting and hustling. When same-year The Intern won more GayVN Awards than the big production Gigolo, studio head Lucas was bothered, stating that "even a retard" would not have chosen the one over the other.

Michael Lucas' Dangerous Liaisons 

In the summer of 2005 Lucas released Michael Lucas' Dangerous Liaisons; the film featured celebrity cameos from RuPaul, Boy George, Graham Norton, Bruce Vilanch, Lady Bunny, Amanda Lepore, and Michael Musto.

Michael Lucas' La Dolce Vita 

In 2006, the studio released Michael Lucas' La Dolce Vita Parts 1 & 2, a gay pornographic remake of the 1960 Fellini classic La Dolce Vita. At a budget of $250,000, the studio contends it is the most expensive gay pornographic film ever made. The film won a record fourteen awards at the 2007 GayVN Awards, winning in every category in which it was nominated.

In February 2007, International Media Films, Inc., which owns the rights to Fellini's La Dolce Vita, filed suit against Lucas (as Andrei Treivas Bregman), Lucas Entertainment, Inc., and Lucas Distribution, Inc. for trademark and copyright infringement. The lawsuit seeks to collect unspecified damages and to stop sales of Michael Lucas' La Dolce Vita Parts 1 & 2. At the preliminary injunction hearing in April, 2007, the attorney for the plaintiff asked the judge to enjoin further distribution of Lucas' film, which he refused to do.

Men of Israel

In May 2009, Lucas Entertainment filmed the first gay porn film using only Israeli models. The production was billed as a sexual journey to promote Israeli culture. In June 2009 the company launched its Men of Israel website to promote the film, which announced its release for July 22.

The film received press coverage. Writing in Tablet Magazine, Wayne Hoffman observed that although mainstream publications from The Atlantic to Out Magazine to Yedioth Aharonoth called the project a landmark as the first gay adult film to feature an all-Israeli cast, Hoffman felt it was a landmark for featuring the first all-Jewish cast.

The openly all-Jewish cast was also remarked upon by the Los Angeles Times blog, which noted that whenever Jews are more open about their Jewish identity it is a "healthy development".

Lucas, however, openly opposed the New York City's Lesbian, Gay, Bisexual and Transgender Community Center's recent (2011) decision to allow a group that opposes Israeli government policies toward Palestinians to meet there.  "Calling the Center an 'anti-Israeli nest' and [Glennda] Testone [the Center's executive director] and Mario Palumbo, the Center's board president, 'staunch anti-Zionists,' Lucas, in a series of emails, asked friends to stop donating to the Center and to contact elected officials to stop any government support." "Asked ... to compare the response to his most recent boycott threat to [an] earlier one, Lucas wrote, 'This group has had their first and last meeting in the Center. If someone fucks with Israel, I fuck them back. And I usually win.'"

Film lines
Lucas Entertainment – The flagship brand featuring gay sex with men in their 20s and 30s.

Lucas Raunch – An extreme fetish line. The first releases were FARTS! and PISS!. In February 2009 the Canada Border Services Agency detained and banned both films. The CBSA's Policy On The Classification Of Obscene Material states that the "ingestion of someone else's urine... with a sexual purpose" made the films obscene, which was cause for banning them.

Sex In Suits – The studio's third line to be launched as its own independent website. Sex In Suits collects Lucas Entertainment's "Gentlemen" line of gay adult films featuring men in suits, which started in 2011 and other business-oriented items. The scenes are filmed in professional settings, allowing the studio to take advantage of its New York City home base. Current scenes on the Sex In Suits website feature bareback sex content.

Publicity campaigns
In 2007 LE sent out a fake press release stating that Lucas had been found dead in his apartment. A photo accompanying the release showed what appeared to be a bound, lifeless Lucas with a conspicuous bruise on his face.  New York magazine's Daily Intel blog questioned the timing of the stunt, which occurred one week after the surprise death of New York performer and Velvet Mafia singer Dean Johnson. The resulting media attention won the studio an Xbiz Award for Best Publicity Stunt.

In conjunction with the German publisher Bruno Gmünder, the studio released the photography book Michael Lucas' Gigolos, which featured many LE models in highly sexualized situations. It included work by photographer Joe Oppedisano, and was lauded for its high production quality as it was designed to be a pornographic fashion book to accompany the studio's film release Gigolos.

After the Lucas Raunch releases FARTS! and PISS! were banned in Canada, Lucas released a letter in the media addressed to President Barack Obama asking for him to intercede on the studio's behalf at an upcoming summit with the Canadian Prime Minister Stephen Harper.

The LGBT blog Queerty responded to a studio marketing video that showed Michael Lucas simulating oral sex both with and on a Barbie doll. While acknowledging the overt attempt to draw traffic to his site with the video as linkbait, Queerty expressed admiration for Lucas' ability to create buzz for his company in the rapidly changing adult entertainment industry.

Awards and recognition
The studio has garnered many GayVN Awards and Adult Erotic Gay Video Awards ("Grabbys") nominations and wins.

Timothy Greenfield-Sanders profiled Lucas in his 2004 book XXX: 30 Porn Star Photographs and the accompanying HBO documentary Thinking XXX. Greenfield-Sanders asked Lucas, then still primarily known as a performer, for a list of his ten favorite films; the films he listed were all from his own production company.

In 2020, Michael Lucas and the models of Lucas Entertainment were featured in the Gruenholtz book, "Uncensored: My Year Behind the Scenes with Michael Lucas and His Models." The book documents photography by Gruenholtz as he shadowed Lucas and his productions over the course of one year in New York, Fire Island, Puerto Vallarta, and Barcelona.

At the 2009 GayVN Awards studio head Lucas was inducted into the GayVN Hall of Fame.

The studio also received a nomination for a 2010 XBIZ Award in the category of GLBT Company of the Year.

Notable directors
 Michael Lucas
 mr. Pam

Notable performers

 D.O.
 Vito Gallo
 Rod Daily
 Andy O'Neill
 Chris Crocker
 Rafael Alencar
 Ben Andrews
 Rod Barry
 Nick Capra
 Matt Cole
 Eddie Diaz
 Darius Ferdynand
 Derrick Hanson
 Steve Holmes
 Wolf Hudson
 Brett M. Hunt
 Oliver Hunt
 Wilfried Knight
 Michael Lucas
 Gus Mattox
 Arpad Miklos
 Vin Nolan
 Sunny Noonan
 Spencer Quest
 Zack Randall
 Cole Ryan
 Rob Romoni
 Sahaj
 Matan Shalev
 Joe Strong
 Jonathan Vargas
 Jackson Wild
 Naor Tal
 Manuel Torres
 Kurt Wild
 Jonathan Agassi
 Drae Axtell

See also

 List of performers in gay porn films
 List of gay pornographic movie studios
 Pornography
 Video Interview with Michael Lucas at Philadelphia's QFest 2010

References

External links
 
 

American gay pornographic film studios
Pornography in New York (state)
LGBT culture in New York City
Entertainment companies based in New York City
American companies established in 1998
Entertainment companies established in 1998
Mass media companies established in 1998
1998 establishments in New York City